Fargush (also Romanized as Fargūsh; also known as Farkūsh) is a village in Aghmiyun Rural District, in the Central District of Sarab County, East Azerbaijan Province, Iran. At the 2006 census, its population was 938, in 247 families.

References 

Populated places in Sarab County